Live at Eindhoven is a live EP by American thrash metal band Testament. It was released in 1987 via Megaforce Records for Europe in 1987 and the US in 1990. It was recorded at the Dynamo Open Air Festival in Eindhoven, Netherlands on June 8, 1987.

A remastered version of the album titled Live at Eindhoven '87 was released on April 14, 2009.

Track listing

Credits
Chuck Billy: vocals
Alex Skolnick: lead guitar
Eric Peterson: rhythm guitar
Greg Christian: bass guitar
Louie Clemente: drums

Live at Eindhoven '87

Live at Eindhoven '87 is a remastered reissue of the Live at Eindhoven EP, released on April 14, 2009 through Prosthetic Records. It now features the group's complete 1987 performance at that year's Dynamo Open Air Festival in Eindhoven, as well as a newly designed cover artwork.

Track listing

Credits
Chuck Billy: vocals
Alex Skolnick: lead Guitar
Eric Peterson: rhythm Guitar
Greg Christian: bass
Louie Clemente: drums

References

1987 live albums
Testament (band) live albums
Atlantic Records live albums
Megaforce Records live albums
Live thrash metal albums
Prosthetic Records live albums